Norman Rock (30 August 1864 – 7 February 1945) was an Australian cricketer. He played two first-class matches for Tasmania between 1890 and 1894.

See also
 List of Tasmanian representative cricketers

References

External links
 

1864 births
1945 deaths
Australian cricketers
Tasmania cricketers
Cricketers from Tasmania